The discography of Japanese boy band SMAP consists of 21 studio albums, 5 compilation albums, 23 video albums, and numerous singles. Sports Music Assemble People, abbreviated as SMAP, was formed in 1988 by a group of backup dancers for the boy band Hikaru Genji of Johnny & Associates. The band's initial releases performed poorly on the charts, but the following ones started gaining attention, aided by the group's appearance on their own variety show, SMAP×SMAP. Meanwhile Kimi Iro Omoi single was used in anime Akazukin Chacha broadcast in Japan only. In worldwide broadcast, Kimi Iro Omoi single was replaced by Shoko Sawada. However, that single can only available on MP3 Store, then download between TV Size and Full version. Their 2003 single "Sekai ni Hitotsu Dake no Hana" sold over two million copies in Japan, becoming one of the best-selling singles in the country. In August 2016, the group announced that they will disband by the year end. Since 2003, all of the band's releases have peaked at number one on the Oricon Albums or Singles Chart. The group has sold over 38,5 million records in Japan.

Studio albums

Compilation albums

Remix albums

Extended plays

Singles

Promotional singles

Other songs

Videography

Video albums

Notes

References

External links
Official website 

Discographies of Japanese artists
Pop music group discographies